Guradel (also Romanized as Gūrādel; also known as Gūrādīl, Karādel, Keradel, and Keravīl) is a village in Fuladlui Shomali Rural District, Hir District, Ardabil County, Ardabil Province, Iran. At the 2006 census, its population was 377, in 91 families.

References 

Towns and villages in Ardabil County